The 1977 Pau Grand Prix was a Formula Two motor race held on 30 May 1977 at the Pau circuit, in Pau, Pyrénées-Atlantiques, France. The Grand Prix was won by René Arnoux, driving the Martini MK22. Didier Pironi finished second and Riccardo Patrese third.

With the race initially being run at 73 laps, the race was stopped after 59 laps after colossal rain made the circuit virtually undrivable.

Classification

Race

References

Pau Grand Prix
1977 in French motorsport